Macleay Valley Mustangs Rugby League Football Club is an amateur rugby league club in the Group 3 Rugby League competition, based on the Mid North Coast of New South Wales. The Mustangs are the main rugby league club based in Kempsey, New South Wales and surrounding areas of Kempsey Shire.

About 
The Macleay Valley Mustangs are a rugby league club based in Kempsey, New South Wales. The club fields Under 18s, League Tag, Reserve Grade & First Grade sides in the Group 3 competition. The club is a supportive system for young rugby league players in Kempsey Shire area to further their rugby league careers as adults, and acts as a pathway to higher level competitions as well as a local team for those aspiring to play at just a community level.

2012
Macleay Valley Mustangs won the 2012 Group 2 Premiership over Nambucca Heads Roosters in the Grand Final 36–12.

2013
Macleay Valley Rugby League Club was expelled from the remainder of the 2013 Group 2 competition. An "independent panel" convened by Country Rugby League made the decision after considering a motion that the Mustangs had brought rugby league into disrepute. This came after events at Geoff King Motors Oval in 2013 where a match involving Coffs Harbour Comets was abandoned following a wild melee in the 61st minute.
Group 2's chief administrator Jim Anderson said Macleay Valley's lower grades sides would not take part in the semi-finals series of 2013 due to the incidents.

2014
The Macleay Valley club was again excluded, this time from Group 3 ahead of the 2015 season. They were found guilty of breaching the group's code of conduct and the National Rugby League code of conduct during the season. This was despite having beaten Wauchope in the Grand Final 25-24.

2019
Macleay Valley won its third premiership in seven years, defeating Wauchope again in the Grand Final.

Titles

Notable players
 Wayne Bartrim – Gold Coast Seagulls, St. George Dragons, St. George Illawarra & Castleford Tigers
 Sam Howe – Gold Coast Titans NRL Under-20s 
 Malcom Webster Jr. – South Sydney Rabbitohs Toyota Cup player
 Anthony Cowan

References

Rugby league teams in New South Wales
Rugby clubs established in 1995
1995 establishments in Australia
Kempsey, New South Wales